Joseph M. Horn is an American psychologist and geneticist known for his work on adoption studies.

Biography
Horn earned his Bachelor of Science degree at Oklahoma State University in 1963 and his Master of Arts at the University of Minnesota in 1967. He received his Ph.D. from the University of Minnesota in 1969. Horn taught at the University of Texas at Austin. His research interests include intelligence and personality and their development, individual differences more generally, and vocational behavior. His research using behavior genetics is perhaps most influential.

Importantly, he initiated the Texas Adoption Project in 1972, recruiting over 500 adopted children, their biological mothers, and adoptive parents and sibs. This ongoing longitudinal study has led to numerous publications shedding light on human development and the roles of genes and environments in behavior 

The key, surprising, findings are summarized in this quote:

In 1994 he was one of 52 signatories on "Mainstream Science on Intelligence", an editorial written by Linda Gottfredson and published in the Wall Street Journal, which declared the consensus of the signing scholars on issues related to intelligence research following the publication of the book The Bell Curve.

Selected works
 Horn, J. M., Loehlin, J. C., & Willerman, L. (1979). Intellectual resemblance among adoptive and biological relatives. Behavior Genetics, 9, 177–207.
 Horn, J. M. (1983). The Texas Adoption Project: Adopted children and their intellectual resemblance to biological and adoptive parents. Child Development, 54, 268–275.
 Loehlin, J. C., Horn, J. M., & Willerman, L. (1990). Heredity, environment, and personality change: Evidence from the Texas Adoption Project. Journal of Personality, 58, 221–243.

References

External links 
Joseph Horn webpage at University of Texas at Austin
Highlights of Pioneer Fund Research and Grantees

1940 births
Living people
American geneticists
21st-century American psychologists
Behavior geneticists
Oklahoma State University alumni
Race and intelligence controversy
University of Minnesota alumni
University of Texas at Austin faculty
20th-century American psychologists